The 1998–99 Tennessee Volunteers basketball team represented the University of Tennessee during the 1998–99 NCAA Division I men's basketball season. The team was led by second-year head coach Jerry Green, and played their home games at Thompson–Boling Arena in Knoxville, Tennessee as a member of the Southeastern Conference. After finishing first in the SEC East regular season standings with a 12–4 conference record, they were invited to the NCAA tournament where they reached the second round.

Roster

Schedule and results

|-
!colspan=12 style=|Regular season

|-
!colspan=12 style=| SEC tournament

|-
!colspan=12 style=| NCAA tournament

Source

Rankings

References

Tennessee Volunteers basketball seasons
Tennessee Volunteers
Volunteers basketball
Volunteers basketball
Tennessee